The Stage Coaches Act 1788 (28 Geo 3 c 57) was an Act of the Parliament of Great Britain to regulate the use of stagecoaches. It came into force from 1 November 1788. It stipulated that no more than six people were permitted to ride upon the roof, and no more than two upon the box, of any coach or carriage traveling for hire. The penalty was to be a fine of forty shillings per person over the limit, levied on the driver; if the driver was the owner, they were to be fined four pounds per person. If the driver could not be found, then the owner was liable to the 40s penalty. The Act was later amended and clarified by the Stage Coaches Act 1790.

The Act was repealed by section 1 of the 50 Geo 3 c 39.

References
The annual register, or, A view of the history, politics and literature for the year 1790. London, 1802. p. 274.

Road transport in the United Kingdom
Repealed Great Britain Acts of Parliament
Great Britain Acts of Parliament 1788
Transport law in the United Kingdom
History of transport in the United Kingdom
1788 in transport
Transport legislation